Adiantum trapeziforme, the giant maidenhair or diamond maidenhair, is a species of fern in the genus Adiantum, native to the tropical rainforests of Central and South America.

References

trapeziforme
Ferns of the Americas
Flora of Central America
Flora of South America
Flora of the Amazon
Ferns of Brazil
Ferns of Ecuador
Plants described in 1753
Taxa named by Carl Linnaeus
Vulnerable flora of South America